Dapo may be:
Krumen language, a dialect continuum with over a dozen dialects spoken by the Krumen people of Liberia and Ivory Coast, a branch of the Grebo languages, a subfamily of the Kru languages and ultimately of the Niger–Congo languages
Nambo language, a Papuan dialect cluster of Papua New Guinea